Svelvik is a village and statistical area (grunnkrets) in Tjøme municipality, Norway.

The statistical area Svelvik, which also can include the peripheral parts of the village as well as the surrounding countryside, has a population of 630.

The village Svelvik is located north of Tjøme village and west of Grimestad. It does not belong to an urban settlement.

References

Villages in Vestfold og Telemark